In recent years, many megaliths have been discovered in the Urals: dolmens, menhirs and a large megalithic cultic complex on Vera Island.

Dolmens of the Middle Urals
At present, more than 200 dolmens have been discovered in the Sverdlovsk Oblast. Specificity of the dolmens in the Middle Urals is their relatively small size (width and length no more than 1.5 - 2.5 m) and original constructions. Based on differences in their construction, it is possible to distinguish two main types of dolmen:
1. dolmens of stone plates and mound; 
2. boulder dolmens. 
Dolmens of stone plates are structures consisting of a mound of stones and soil, with a stone chamber attached to it. Usually there is a square court in front of such dolmens. Sometimes such a court is surrounded by stones. 
The boulder dolmens had been made of massive boulders forming a chamber. From above the chamber is covered by either one or several flat boulders. Despite the differences of form and size of their chambers, all the boulder dolmens are identical in one respect: they all have two entrances - the main entrance (in one of its side walls) and another, narrower entrance between the boulders.

Menhirs
The commonest megalithic structures of the steppe area of the Urals are menhirs. They are crude or roughly finished stones standing on the surface. This type of object is also found in forested areas, but very rarely and usually associated with dolmens. There are several types of menhirs in the Southern Urals: single, stone rows, complexes of menhirs, and circular structures of menhirs. 

All discovered single menhirs are usually situated close to Bronze Age settlements or cemeteries. For this reason, archaeologists believe that they date from this period, and the evidence of limited excavations does not contradict this conclusion. 
Stone rows are for the most part oriented in an east–west direction. The length of some known rows is 13-18 m. The most massive stones are situated in the center, forming the core of the composition. Topography of the stone rows (their location in landscape) is very variable and has no clear strong pattern. 

An unexpected discovery is a circular structure of menhirs at the village of Akhunovo in Bashkiria. This is a circular structure with a diameter of about 25 m, and consisting of eight menhirs. The two largest stones are aligned in the north–south direction inside the ring. One of these central stones is surrounded by a ring (diameter 3.5 m) of post holes. The position these holes precisely repeats the structure of the whole stone ring, each hole corresponds to a menhir of the ring.

Vera Island
The greatest megalithic complex of the Ural Mountains is situated on Vera Island in Lake Turgoyak. It belongs to the Chalcolithic (Eneolithic) period. There are several objects:

Megalith №1
The biggest structure of the island is megalith №1 – a stone drywall construction 19×6 m, cut into the bedrock and covered with megalithic capstones. The megalith is oriented west–east. An entrance, partly destroyed now, is in the east. Inside the megalith consists of the long entrance, a Central hall and two chambers (Western and Northern), connected by a corridor one another. The height of all the chambers (with the exception of the low corridors) is no less than 1.9 m, often more than 2 m. 
The presence of windows and stone sculptures of heads of animals (bull and wolf), together with impressive size of the megalith, distinguish it from other megalithic buildings of the island. It seems that megalith 1 was a temple built for rituals connected with any transitions from one condition to another: rituals of either age initiations or change of status (lodgment of power of a chief or priest).

Megalith №2
Megalith №2 is a cut in a rocky slope and covered by a mound stone structure oriented north–south, whose internal size is 7.5 m × 1.7 m × 3.5 m. It consists of two chambers connected by a corridor. The entrance of the southern chamber is faced to the west. It has a double portal, it could serve for penetrating sun rays.

Megalith №3
One more megalithic structure (№ 3) consists of large boulders (weight of the largest of them is at least 14-15 ton). Between the boulders a square pit is situated cut in rock. Vertical stone slabs were closing both sides of the construction. Massive boulders had been prepared as capstones. In the east the complex has a mound made of broken stone, but it has been not excavated yet.

Vera Island 9
There is a cultic ritual place  on the island (Vera Island 9) consisted of two menhirs whose axis line sets a direction west–east. This direction is very typical of megalithic orientations of the island. In addition to this there were two fireplaces and a large altar stone. 
There is one larger menhir in the south-east. This menhir had been erected to mark a direction to the sunset in midwinter. The destination of this open-air sanctuary was rituals connected with seasonal circles.

Vera Island 4
A cultic place (5.5×4 m) surrounded by vertical stones and paved with massive granite plates tightly adjusted to one another is situated on the settlements of Vera Island 4. There was a small menhir in a center of this place. The exact destination is unknown.

A quarry is a unique addition to the megalithic complex of the island. Stones of the quarry have clear traces of copper tools as well as wooden wedges. By means of these wedges and water ancient megalithic builders could cut granite and extract needed stone blocks. There are also traces of extractions of large stone plates used as megalithic capstones.

Geoglyph
The discovery of a giant land art drawing of a moose or elk was made by Alexander Shestakov using satellite imagery and reported on in 2011 in the journal Antiquity. The geoglyph is located on the slopes of the Zyuratkul Mountains and has accurate contours of an animal similar to elk (54˚56'33" N 59˚11'32" E). Its borders consisted of large stones, and the center was filled with small stones. Builders of the object cut off a soil layer up to virgin clay, and placed stones into this trench. 
Now the stones are covered by a layer of patina and have a dark shade. But earlier they were light and were perfectly visible from the ridge, because the size of the drawing is huge.
It is unknown today, whether this geoglyph belongs to the period of the same megalithic culture, as megaliths of the Vera Island. Everywhere, from geoglyphs in the Nazca Lines to the Blythe geoglyphs in California and several in England it is very difficult to date them. But a very early date for this geoglyph is probable.

In 2012, Stanislav Grigoriev from the Russian Academy of Sciences Institute of History and Archaeology has suggested that stone tools found during recent excavations show a style of Lithic reduction dating to the Neolithic or Eneolithic periods between 4000 and 2000 BCE. This suggested dating would place the construction of the  geoglyph many centuries before that of the Nazca lines in Peru, build around 500 CE.

See also
 Megaliths
 Geoglyph

References

Literature:
 Григорьев С.А. Меньшенин Н.М. Мегалитические сооружения острова Вера на озере Тургояк в Южном Зауралье // Известия Челябинского научного центра, 2004. Вып. 1, с. 208-213. http://www.csc.ac.ru/news/2004_1/2004_1_13_2.zip
 Васина Ю.В., Григорьев С.А. Мегалитические сооружения на озере Тургояк в Южном Зауралье // Этнические взаимодействия на Южном Урале. Челябинск: Рифей, 2004. С. 30-33.
 Бодрых А.А. Мои встречи с археологическими памятниками // Четвертые Берсовские чтения. Екатеринбург: Аква-Пресс, 2004, с. 225-228.
 Непомнящий В.Г. "Уральские дольмены": взгляд краеведов // Четвертые Берсовские чтения. Екатеринбург: Аква-Пресс, 2004, с. 229-230.
 Морозов В.М., Святов В.Н., Чаиркин С.Е. Новый тип археологических памятников горно-лесного Зауралья // Четвертые Берсовские чтения. Екатеринбург: Аква-Пресс, 2004, с. 231-236.
 Grigoriev S.A., Vasina J.V., 2005. The megalithic constructions of the Vera Island on the Turgoyak Lake in the Southern Transurals // Comparative archaeology. https://web.archive.org/web/20110416045639/http://www.comp-archaeology.org/GrigMegtUrals.htm
 Васина Ю.В., Григорьев С.А. Рекогносцировочные исследования мегалитических сооружений на озере Тургояк в Южном Зауралье // Известия Челябинского научного центра. 2005, вып. 2, с. 105-109. http://www.csc.ac.ru/news/2005_2/2005_2_13_2.zip
 Непомнящий В.Г. Рифейские дольмены. Екатеринбург: Филантроп, 2005 - 28 с.
 Гаврилюк А.Г., Григорьев С.А., Марков С.С., 2006. Погребальные памятники эпохи бронзы // Археология Южного Урала Степь. Челябинск: Рифей. С. 89-152.
 Grigoriev S.A. The Ural Megaliths and the European tradition: Chronological and Cultural Contexts // XV Congress of the International Union for Prehistoric and Protohistoric Sciences. Book of Abstracts. V. I. Lisbon, 2006. P. 426.
 Григорьев С.А., Ивасько Л.В., Слепухин С.В., Бердюгина Н.Ю., Галин С.С.. Мегалитическая традиция на Урале и проблема пышминских дольменов // Известия Челябинского научного центра, 2006, вып. 3. С. 114-118. http://www.csc.ac.ru/ej/file/3354
 Васина Ю.В., Григорьев С.А. Мегалиты острова Веры - археоастрономический аспект // Астрономическое и мировоззренческое содержание археологических памятников Южного Урала. Тезисы докладов полевого семинара. Челябинск: ЧелГУ, 2006. С. 25-27.
 Петров Ф.Н., 2006. Мегалитический комплекс Ахуново: древняя пригоризонтная обсерватория // Астрономическое и мировоззренческое содержание археологических памятников Южного Урала. Челябинск: ЧелГУ, с. 27-31.
 Полякова Е.Л., 2006. История изучения мегалитических памятников Южного Зауралья // Этнические взаимодействия на Южном Урале. Челябинск: ЧелГУ, с. 61-65.
 Григорьев С.А., Васина Ю.В., Котов В.Г., Ивасько Л.В. Проблема датировки мегалитических комплексов Урала // XVII Уральское археологическое совещание. Материалы научной конференции (Екатеринбург, 19-22 ноября 2007 г.). - Екатеринбург - Сургут: изд-во "Магеллан", 2007, с. 82, 83.
 Григорьев С.А., Ивасько Л.В., Котов В.Г. Мегалитические комплексы Урала, проблема их датировки и происхождения (по материалам раскопок на озере Тургояк в 2007 г.) // Гуманитарные науки в Башкортостане: История и современность: Материалы Международной научно-практической конференции, посвященной 75-летию Института истории, языка и литературы Уфимского научного центра РАН. - Уфа: Гилем, 2007, с. 78-80.
 Григорьев С.А., Васина Ю.В. Мегалиты Южного Урала и проблема их хронологической и культурной интерпретации // Народы Саратовского Поволжья: этнология, этнография, духовная и материальная культура. Саратов: "Триумф", 2006. С. 115-125.
 Григорьев С.А., Васина Ю.В., Ивасько Л.В., Котов В.Г. Создание музея мегалитов на острове Веры // Достояние поколений. 1 (4) 2008, с. 18-23.
 Григорьев С.А., Васина Ю.В. Остров Веры = Grigoriev, S.A., Vasina, Yu.V. Vera Island // Южный Урал. Путешествие через тысячелетия = South Ural. Traveling through millenniums. Chelyabinsk: Krokus, 2009. P. 11-15.
 Григорьев С.А. Землетрясения в голоцене на Урале и их связь с климатическими изменениями // Географическое пространство: сбалансированное развитие природы и общества. - Челябинск: АБРИС, 2009. - С. 15-25.
 Григорьев С.А., Васина Ю.В., Ивасько Л.В., Котов В.Г. Мегалитические комплексы Урала: проблема датировки // Труды II (XVIII) Всероссийского археологического съезда в Суздале. Т I - М,: ИА РАН, 2008, с. 204-206.
 Григорьев С.А., Ивасько Л.В. Остров Веры. Археологический музей-заповедник под открытым небом // Сборник научных статей и материалов участников V Международной научно-практической конференции. Проблемы устойчивого развития городов. - Миасс: ООО Агентство "ТЭРРА"; Геотур. Т. I. - 2008, с. 303-305.
 Григорьев С.А. Мегалиты острова Веры и археоастрономия. ASTROKAZAN - 2009. REPORTS. (материалы конференции). Казань: КГУ, 2009, стр. 8-12.
 Grigoriev S.A., Vasina J.V. Megaliths of the Vera Island in the Southern Urals. In: British archaeological report. International series 2123. Monumental questions: prehistoric megaliths, mounds and enclosures. Oxford, 2010, pp. 179-185.
 Григорьев С. А. Мегалиты Урала в свете индоевропейской проблемы // Индоевропейская история в свете новых исследований. Москва: издательство МГОУ, 2010, с. 195-204.
 Григорьев С.А. Каменные орудия поселения Остров Веры 4 // Челябинский гуманитарий. 2010. № 10. С. 147-156.
 Григорьев С. А. Природные катастрофы в энеолите на Урале доклад на УАС // XVIII Уральское археологическое совещание: культурные области, археологические культуры, хронология. Уфа, 2010, с. 69-71.
 Полякова Е.Л. Раскопки аллеи менгиров Чека 2 в Кизильском районе Челябинской области в 2009 г. // XVIII Уральское археологическое совещание: культурные области, археологические культуры, хронология. Уфа, 2010, с. 357-359.

Megalithic monuments in Europe
Prehistoric Russia
Culture of Chelyabinsk Oblast
Objects of cultural heritage of Russia of regional significance
Cultural heritage monuments in Chelyabinsk Oblast